Drzewce may refer to:

Drzewce, Kuyavian-Pomeranian Voivodeship (north-central Poland)
Drzewce, Łódź Voivodeship (central Poland)
Drzewce, Lublin Voivodeship (east Poland)
Drzewce, Gostyń County in Greater Poland Voivodeship (west-central Poland)
Drzewce, Gmina Olszówka in Greater Poland Voivodeship (west-central Poland)
Drzewce, Gmina Osiek Mały in Greater Poland Voivodeship (west-central Poland)
Drzewce, Międzychód County in Greater Poland Voivodeship (west-central Poland)
Drzewce, Słupca County in Greater Poland Voivodeship (west-central Poland)
Drzewce, Lubusz Voivodeship (west Poland)

See also
Drzewica (disambiguation)